Numerous pipeline transport projects have been developed or are under development including:

List of natural gas pipelines
List of oil pipelines